Zambrano is a town and municipality located in the Bolívar Department, northern Colombia.It was founded in 1770 By Don Alvaro de Zambrano in what was once Territories which belonged to the native Malibùes. It is located Two and a half Hours from the Departmental capital, Cartagena, Bolivar. During the War for independence, Zambrano played a very important role in the support for Simon Bolivar and for independence from the Kingdom of Spain by many Brave troops fighting for the Colombian Independence movement. In fact, Simon Bolivar stayed one night in Zambrano and was housed by the Campillo Family. The economy is largely agricultural and thanks to its location on the Magdalena River.

References

Municipalities of Bolívar Department